Sam Dixon or Samuel Dixon may refer to:
 Sam Dixon (humanitarian) (died 2010), Methodist charity executive who died in the 2010 Haiti earthquake
 Sam Dixon (basketball coach) (born 1957), high school basketball coach
 Samantha Dixon, British Labour Party politician
 Samuel Dixon, Australian songwriter, producer and musician
 Samuel Dixon (artist) (died 1769), Irish artist
 Samuel Dixon (West Virginia businessman) (1856–1934), industrialist and politician in West Virginia
 Samuel Gibson Dixon (1851–1918), American physician and bacteriologist
 Samuel J. Dixon, American-Canadian photographer and aerialist
 Samuel Dixon, principal of Bohemia Manor High School, 1958–1960

See also
 Samuel Dickson (disambiguation)